Bangladesh Petroleum Exploration and Production Company Limited is a Bangladesh government owned company responsible for petroleum exploration and production.

History
Bangladesh Petroleum Exploration and Production Company Limited was established in 1989 by the Government of Bangladesh through dissolving the Exploration Directorate of Petrobangla. In October 2017, Bangladesh Petroleum Exploration and Production Company Limited discovered gas in Bhola, Shahbazpur Gas Field. In March 2020, it discovered Srikail Gas Field in Comilla District.

References

Organisations based in Dhaka
Government-owned companies of Bangladesh
Bangladeshi companies established in 1989
Energy companies established in 1989